Jack Charles (1943–2022) was an Australian actor and activist.

Jack Charles may also refer to:

See also
Jacques Charles (1746–1823), French inventor, scientist, mathematician
John Charles (disambiguation)
Charles Jack (1810–1896), Irish farmer and landowner